This is an alphabetical list of cricketers who played for Surrey Stars during their existence between 2016 and 2019. They competed in the Women's Cricket Super League, a Twenty20 competition, during these years before being replaced by South East Stars as part of a restructure of English women's domestic cricket.

Players' names are followed by the years in which they were active as a Surrey Stars player. Seasons given are first and last seasons; the player did not necessarily play in all the intervening seasons. This list only includes players who appeared in at least one match for Surrey Stars; players who were named in the team's squad for a season but did not play a match are not included.

B
 Tammy Beaumont (2016–2017)

C
 Aylish Cranstone (2018–2019)

D
 Naomi Dattani (2016)
 Gwenan Davies (2019)
 Sophia Dunkley (2016–2018)

F
 Rene Farrell (2016–2017)

G
 Grace Gibbs (2017–2019)
 Amy Gordon (2019)
 Eva Gray (2018–2019)
 Cordelia Griffith (2016)

H
 Alex Hartley (2016–2017)

J
 Hannah Jones (2017–2019)

K
 Marizanne Kapp (2016–2019)

L
 Lizelle Lee (2017–2019)

M
 Laura Marsh (2016–2019)
 Beth Morgan (2016)

S
 Nat Sciver (2016–2019)
 Bryony Smith (2016–2019)
 Rhianna Southby (2018–2019)

T
 Lea Tahuhu (2016)
 Sarah Taylor (2018–2019)

V
 Dane van Niekerk (2018–2019)
 Mady Villiers (2018–2019)

Captains

See also
 List of South East Stars cricketers

References

Surrey Stars